Cecilia Nettelbrandt (1922-2009) was a Swedish politician (Liberals (Sweden)). 

She was MP of the Second Chamber of the Parliament of Sweden in 1961–1976.

References

1922 births
2009 deaths
20th-century Swedish politicians
20th-century Swedish women politicians
Women members of the Riksdag